The Noble Sage is a contemporary art gallery in London. It was opened by Jana Manuelpillai in 2006. 

The gallery specialises exclusively in Indian, Sri Lankan and Pakistani contemporary art and represents over thirty artists. The collection includes over 300 artworks, most of which are paintings and works on paper from South India, Pakistan and Sri Lanka.

Exhibitions 

 April 2006 – Jana Manuelpillai opened The Noble Sage. Drawn primarily from the alumni of the Government College of Fine Arts, Chennai, the first exhibition Chennai Excite featured works by seventeen contemporary Chennai artists, many of them residing in the Cholamandal and Padappai Artists Villages. The artists included senior figures of South Indian art, such as K. M. Adimoolam, S. Dhanapal and R. B. Bhaskaran and emergent artists like T. Athiveerapandian, P. Jayakani and Benitha Perciyal.
 May 2007 - In The Fore 2007 - Alphonso Doss, Rekha Rao, C. F. John and A. P. Santhanaraj
 August 2007 - India Now!- The Official Festival Exhibition- Collaborative exhibition with the Bharatiya Vidya Bhavan in Kensington for the Mayor of London’s INDIA NOW! festival with over thirty works from The Noble Sage collection.
 August 2007 - She, India: India through the eyes of its women. 'She, India' featured the work of nine female artists from India. Artists included: Gayatri Gamuz, Asma Menon, Eleena Banik and V. Anamika
 April 2008- Trilogy- M. Siva, Benitha Perciyal and N. Prasannakumar
 June 2008 - In The Fore 2009 - Achuthan Kudallur, Ganesh Selvaraj, P. Jayakani and T. Athiveerapandian
 September 2008 – Never Alone But Together- The drawings and sculptures of Ashok Patel
 October 2008- Tasaduq Sohail- Small oils and watercolours
 February 2009 - The Beating Heart of Kerala- The largest exhibition of works by artists from Kerala in the UK. The six artists included in the exhibition were Murali Nagapuzha, Manoj Vyloor, S. Ravi Shankar, T. R. Upendranath, A. S. Sajith and Pradeep Puthoor
 May 2009 - In The Fore 2009 - A. P. Santhanaraj, Anoma Wijewardene and Narayanan V.
 June 2009- January 2010 - Understanding Contemporary Art, Brent Museum
 October 2009 - Further Towards Nature. New abstract canvases by T. Athiveerapandian
 February 2010 - Chennai Revisited - Featuring V. Anamika, Shailesh BO, C. Dakshinamoorthy, Radha, N. Raghavan and G. Raman
 April 2010 - Tableau. New works by S. Ravi Shankar
 June 2010. The Vibrant World of Asia

Asian Arthouse Film Night

The Noble Sage holds regular screenings of art house films from the Indian Subcontinent.

Asian Literary Evenings 

The Noble Sage has hosted literary evenings highlighting Asian writers and poets. They include:

 Rohan Candappa
 Ardashir Vakil
 Jaishree Misra
 Kamila Shamsie
 Jeet Thayil
 Aamer Hussein
 Romesh Gunesekera

Sources
Indian Art Since The Early 40s - A search For Identity, Cholamandal Artists' Handicrafts Association, Janatha Press, 1974
Contemporary Indian Art, Glenbarra art Museum Collection, Japan, 1993
Iromie Wijewardena Paintings, Gamini Jaisinghe, Sarvodaya Vishwa Lekha Publications, 2006
Major Trends in Indian Art, Rm. Palaniappan, Lalit Kala Akademi, New Delhi, 1997

Notes and references

External links

Contemporary art galleries in London
Indian contemporary art
Pakistani contemporary art
Art galleries established in 2006
2006 establishments in England